Anne Laplantine (born 21 October 1972), also known as Michiko Kusaki or Angelika Koehlermann, is a French musician and video artist. She currently lives and works in Paris.

Discography

Albums

As Anne Laplantine 
 1999: Nordheim (Gooom Disques)
 2000: Alison (Alice in Wonder)
 2001: Live à Dijon (Alice in Wonder)
 2003: Anne : Hamburg (Datamusik)
 2003: Anne : Hamburg, 3x7" (Tomlab)
 2004: Discipline (Emphase)
 2005: We (Elefantkvinnan)
 2009: A Little May Time Be (Ahornfelder)
 2009: Spring Won't Find Us 7" (Tona Serenad)

As Michiko Kusaki 
 1999: Bye Bye, Babe (Angelika Koehlermann)
 2002: Don't Do That (Hiao Hiao Hiao)

As Angelika Koehlermann 
 2002: Care (Tomlab)

Collaborations
 2004: Summerisle, with Momus (Analog Baroque)
 2005: Starts, with Semuin (Happy Zloty)
 2007: Fa, with F. S. Blumm (Alien Transistor)

Compilations
 2000: formotiondisconfort,callflightattendantforbagdisposal (Peter I'm Flying) :
 "For Motion Disconfort"
 2000: French Tour (Technikart) :
 "Video Game"
 2000: Gooom Tracks (Gooom Disques) :
 "This Activity"
 2000: Christmas Album (Evenement) :
 "La Tarte aux pommes"
 "Messe"
 2001: Traversées [French Fresh Sounds] (UR Éditions)
 2001: VPRO De Avonden XMAS 2001 (VPRO)
 2003: The Second Coco Waffle Flake (Skipp) :
 "Untitled"
 2003: One on One (Emphase) :
 "Flute"
 2004: Spex CD #42 (Spex Magazine) :
 "Discipline 2"
 2004: Re:Electronicat (Angelika Koelhermann) :
 "Birds Want to Have Fun"
 2005: Blackbox (Emphase) :
 "Discipline 5"
 2005: Childish Music (Staubgold) :
 "December"
 2006: CTM.07 Audio Compilation (club transmediale) :
 "Xavier"
 2007: I Regret Not Having Kissed You (Doki Doki) :
 "Spring Won't Find Us"
 2008: Vänskap 002 :
 "Seaside"
 2019: VOLUME#1 (fruits) :
 "T'es où"

Participations, remixes, others 

 1999: Michiko Kusaki/DMX Krew - Let's Rock Baby, split EP (Breaking Records)
 2000: Re:Kusaki (Angelika Koelhermann)
 2001: Encre - Encre (Clapping Music)
 2001: Hans Platzgumer - Denial of Service (Separator)
 2002: Hans Platzgumer - Software (Doxa Records)
 2002: Hypo - Karaoke A Cappela (Active Suspension)
 2003: Sluta Leta - Semi Peterson (Mego)
 2004: F.S. Blumm - Sesamsamen (Plop)
 2005: Hans Platzgumer - Expedition 87-04 (Buntspecht)
 2005: Semuin - Province (Audio Dregs)
 2006: F.S. Blumm - Summer Kling (Morr Music)
 2007: Hypo - Deluxe Edition Archival Recordings 2000-2007 (Intikrec)
 2007: A.J. Holmes - The King of the New Electric Hi-Life (Pingipung)
 2013: Aline - Regarde le ciel (PIAS France)

See also 
 Momus (artist)
 Gooom Disques
 Tomlab

References

External links 
 Personal website
 Official myspace page
 Youtube account
 Discography on Discogs

Musicians from Lyon
Living people
1972 births
French women in electronic music